Giannis Christopoulos may refer to:
 Giannis Christopoulos (footballer, born 1972)
 Giannis Christopoulos (footballer, born 2000)